John Dashwood-King may refer to:
Sir John Dashwood-King, 3rd Baronet (1716–1793), English landowner
Sir John Dashwood-King, 4th Baronet (1765–1849), English MP and landowner, son of the above

See also
John King (disambiguation)